Liolaemus patriciaiturrae is a species of lizard in the family Iguanidae.  It is endemic to Chile.

References

patriciaiturrae
Lizards of South America
Reptiles of Chile
Endemic fauna of Chile
Reptiles described in 1993